John Henry Ricksecker (14 November 1843 - 2 August 1929) was a private in the United States Army who was awarded the Medal of Honor for gallantry during the American Civil War. On November 30, 1864, Ricksecker captured the flag of the 16th Alabama Artillery of the Confederate Army. For this action, he received the Medal of Honor on 3 February 1865.

Personal life 
Ricksecker was born in Richland County, Ohio on November 14, 1843, to parents John Henry Ricksecker Sr. and Eliza Geiger Ricksecker. He was the fifth of eight children, all of whom survived to adulthood. He married Estella May Loomis and fathered 6 children, of which only one, John Gordon Ricksecker, survived to adulthood. He died on August 2, 1929, in Kansas City, Missouri and was buried in Forest Hill Calvary Cemetery in Kansas City.

Military service 
Ricksecker was a private in Company D of the 104th Ohio Infantry. He was awarded the Medal of Honor for capturing the flag of the 16th Alabama Artillery at the Battle of Franklin near Franklin, Tennessee on November 30, 1864.

References 

1843 births
1929 deaths
United States Army Medal of Honor recipients
American Civil War recipients of the Medal of Honor
People from Richland County, Ohio